Miloslav Vlček (born 1 February 1961) is a Czech politician who was the Member of the Czech Chamber of Deputies (MP) from 1996 to 2010. Between the years 2006 and 2010, he served as the Speaker of the Chamber of Deputies. He resigned the speakership in April 2010, due to his involvement in a financial scandal.

References

External links 
 Official Chamber of Deputies website
 Personal website 

1961 births
Living people
People from Konice
Czech Social Democratic Party MPs
Speakers of the Chamber of Deputies (Czech Republic)
Members of the Chamber of Deputies of the Czech Republic (1996–1998)
Members of the Chamber of Deputies of the Czech Republic (1998–2002)
Members of the Chamber of Deputies of the Czech Republic (2002–2006)
Members of the Chamber of Deputies of the Czech Republic (2006–2010)
Mendel University Brno alumni